Elizabeth D. "Beth" Walker (born March 24, 1965) is an American lawyer and jurist serving as the chief justice of the West Virginia Supreme Court of Appeals since 2023. She was elected in the Court's first non-partisan election on May 10, 2016. She began a 12-year term on January 1, 2017. Walker is the 77th justice to serve on the West Virginia Supreme Court of Appeals. She was an unsuccessful candidate for the same office in 2008.

Walker was named in articles of impeachment passed by the West Virginia House of Delegates on August 13, 2018, during the Impeachment of the Supreme Court of Appeals of West Virginia. Thereafter, Walker was "reprimanded and censured" on October 2, 2018, but allowed to remain in office after being the only Justice tried in the West Virginia Senate.

Education 

Walker graduated fromm Hillsdale College,  summa cum laude in 1987, she earned a Juris Doctor in 1990 from the Ohio State University Moritz College of Law, where she was Articles Editor for The Ohio State Law Journal.

She was admitted to practice in the United States Supreme Court, U.S. Court of Appeals for the Fourth and Sixth Circuits, District Courts in West Virginia and Ohio and the Supreme Court of Appeals of West Virginia.

Career 

Prior to taking the bench, Walker was an attorney for West Virginia University Medicine. Prior to that, Walker was a partner in the law firm of Bowles Rice, where she concentrated her statewide practice on labor and employment law for more than 20 years. She has advised large and small employers in a wide variety of industries including manufacturing, energy, health care, financial services, professional services and associations and retail sales.  She also has experience representing higher education entities, municipalities, counties and boards of education in the public sector.

In 2012, Walker was elected a Fellow of the College of Labor and Employment Lawyers, which is an international membership association of more than one thousand lawyers who practice in labor employment law.

West Virginia Court of Appeals

Campaign 
Walker stated that she was running for the Supreme Court of Appeals of West Virginia because West Virginians deserve a fair and impartial court system. She stated that she understands the importance of the role of the Supreme Court as an independent branch of government.  She was generally considered the right-most of the four serious candidates in the 2016 nonpartisan election. Those she defeated to earn the spot included then-current Justice Brent Benjamin (the incumbent), former Justice and state Attorney General Darrell McGraw, and future Justice William Wooton.

Female majority 
Once Walker took office, West Virginia briefly had a female majority on the state Supreme Court for the first time in history. At the time, West Virginia was one of 11 states whose top courts had a majority of women.

Chief justice 

Walker served as chief justice in 2019 and has served again as chief since 2023.

Impeachment 
Following a series of controversies involving excessive spending, the West Virginia House Judiciary Committee  voted on August 7, 2018 to recommend that Walker and the other three remaining justices be impeached "for maladministration, corruption, incompetency, neglect of duty, and certain high crimes and misdemeanors". On August 13, 2018 the full House of Delegates approved the Judiciary Committee recommendation and impeached Walker. On October 2, 2018, after a two-day impeachment trial, the West Virginia Senate, in a 32-1-1 vote, decided not to remove Walker from office. The Senate later voted to publicly "reprimand and censure" Walker for her actions in the spending scandal.

Affiliations 
Walker is a 1999 graduate of Leadership West Virginia and past Chair of that organization's Board of Directors. She also is a past president of the board of Kanawha Pastoral Counseling Center.  She is past Board Chair and current board member of Girl Scouts of Black Diamond Council.

Personal 
She is married to Mike Walker, an attorney and former executive vice president of Cecil I. Walker Machinery Co. They reside in Charleston, West Virginia.

Elections

References 

|-

|-

1965 births
Living people
Place of birth missing (living people)
21st-century American judges
21st-century American women judges
American women lawyers
Chief Justices of the Supreme Court of Appeals of West Virginia
Hillsdale College alumni
Lawyers from Morgantown, West Virginia
Ohio State University Moritz College of Law alumni
Politicians from Morgantown, West Virginia
United States judges impeached by state or territorial governments
West Virginia Independents
West Virginia lawyers
Women chief justices of state supreme courts in the United States